A detonator, frequently a blasting cap, is a device used to trigger an explosive device. Detonators can be chemically, mechanically, or electrically initiated, the last two being the most common.

The commercial use of explosives uses electrical detonators or the capped fuse which is a length of safety fuse to which an ordinary detonator has been joined. Many detonators' primary explosive is a material called ASA compound. This compound is formed from lead azide, lead styphnate and aluminium and is pressed into place above the base charge, usually TNT or tetryl in military detonators and PETN in commercial detonators.

Other materials such as DDNP (diazo dinitro phenol) are also used as the primary charge to reduce the amount of lead emitted into the atmosphere by mining and quarrying operations. Old detonators used mercury fulminate as the primary, often mixed with potassium chlorate to yield better performance.

A blasting cap is a small sensitive primary explosive device generally used to detonate a larger, more powerful and less sensitive secondary explosive such as TNT, dynamite, or plastic explosive.

Blasting caps come in a variety of types, including non-electric caps, electric caps, and fuse caps. They are used in commercial mining, excavation, and demolition.  Electric types are set off by a short burst of current sent by a blasting machine via a long wire to the cap to ensure safety.  Traditional fuse caps have a fuse which is ignited by a flame source, such as a match or a lighter.

Need for detonators
The need for detonators such as blasting caps came from the development of safer explosives.  Different explosives require different amounts of energy (their activation energy) to detonate.  Most commercial explosives are formulated with a high activation energy, to make them stable and safe to handle so they will not explode if accidentally dropped, mishandled, or exposed to fire. These are called secondary explosives.  However they are correspondingly difficult to detonate intentionally, and require a small initiating explosion.  This is provided by a detonator.

A detonator contains an easy-to-ignite primary explosive that provides the initial activation energy to start the detonation in the main charge. Explosives commonly used in detonators include mercury fulminate, lead azide, lead styphnate, tetryl, and DDNP.  Blasting caps and some detonators are stored separately and not inserted into the main explosive charge until just before use, keeping the main charge safe.  
Early blasting caps also used silver fulminate, but it has been replaced with cheaper and safer primary explosives.
Silver azide is still used sometimes, but very rarely due to its high price.

Detonators are hazardous for untrained personnel to handle since they contain primary explosive.  They are sometimes not recognized as explosives due to their appearance, leading to injuries.

Types

Ordinary detonators
Ordinary detonators usually take the form of ignition-based explosives. While  they are mainly used in commercial operations, ordinary detonators are still used in military operations. This form of detonator is most commonly initiated using a safety fuse, and used in non time-critical detonations e.g. conventional munitions disposal. Well known detonators are lead azide [Pb(N3)2], silver azide [AgN3] and mercury fulminate [Hg(ONC)2].

Electrical detonators
There are three categories of electrical detonators: instantaneous electrical detonators (IED), short period delay detonators (SPD) and long period delay detonators (LPD). SPDs are measured in milliseconds and LPDs are measured in seconds. In situations where nanosecond accuracy is required, specifically in the implosion charges in nuclear weapons, exploding-bridgewire detonators are employed. The initial shock wave is created by vaporizing a length of a thin wire by an electric discharge. A new development is a slapper detonator, which uses thin plates accelerated by an electrically exploded wire or foil to deliver the initial shock. It is in use in some modern weapons systems. A variant of this concept is used in mining operations, when the foil is exploded by a laser pulse delivered to the foil by optical fiber.

Non-electric detonators
A non-electric detonator is a shock tube detonator designed to initiate explosions, generally for the purpose of demolition of buildings and for use in the blasting of rock in mines and quarries. Instead of electric wires, a hollow plastic tube delivers the firing impulse to the detonator, making it immune to most of the hazards associated with stray electric current. It consists of a small diameter, three-layer plastic tube coated on the innermost wall with a reactive explosive compound, which, when ignited, propagates a low energy signal, similar to a dust explosion. The reaction travels at approximately 6,500 ft/s (2,000 m/s) along the length of the tubing with minimal disturbance outside of the tube. Non-electric detonators were invented by the Swedish company Nitro Nobel in the 1960s and 1970s, and launched to the demolitions market in 1973.

Electronic detonators
In civil mining, electronic detonators have a better precision for delays. Electronic detonators are designed to provide the precise control necessary to produce accurate and consistent blasting results in a variety of blasting applications in the mining, quarrying, and construction industries. Electronic detonators may be programmed in millisecond or sub-millisecond increments using a dedicated programming device.

Wireless detonators 
Wireless electronic detonators are beginning to be available in the civil mining market. Encrypted radio signals are used to communicate the blast signal to each detonator at the correct time. While currently expensive, wireless detonators can enable new mining techniques as multiple blasts can be loaded at once and fired in sequence without putting humans in harm's way.

Number 8 blasting caps 
A number 8 test blasting cap is one containing 2 grams of a mixture of 80 percent mercury fulminate and 20 percent potassium chlorate, or a blasting cap of equivalent strength. An equivalent strength cap comprises 0.40-0.45 grams of PETN base charge pressed in an aluminum shell with bottom thickness not to exceed to 0.03 of an inch, to a specific gravity of not less than 1.4 g/cc, and primed with standard weights of primer depending on the manufacturer.

Types of blasting caps

Pyrotechnic fuse blasting cap
The oldest and simplest type of cap, fuse caps are a metal cylinder, closed at one end.  From the open end inwards, there is first an empty space into which a pyrotechnic fuse is inserted and crimped, then a pyrotechnic ignition mix, a primary explosive, and then the main detonating explosive charge.

The primary hazard of pyrotechnic blasting caps is that for proper usage, the fuse must be inserted and then crimped into place by crushing the base of the cap around the fuse.  If the tool used to crimp the cap is used too close to the explosives, the primary explosive compound can detonate during crimping.  A common hazardous practice is crimping caps with one's teeth; an accidental detonation can cause serious injury to the mouth.

Fuse type blasting caps are still in active use today.  They are the safest type to use around certain types of electromagnetic interference, and they have a built in time delay as the fuse burns down.

Solid pack electric blasting cap
Solid pack electric blasting caps use a thin bridgewire in direct contact (hence solid pack) with a primary explosive, which is heated by electric current and causes the detonation of the primary explosive.  That primary explosive then detonates a larger charge of secondary explosive.

Some solid pack fuses incorporate a small pyrotechnic delay element, up to a few hundred milliseconds, before the cap fires.

Match or fusehead electric blasting cap
Match type blasting caps use an electric match (insulating sheet with electrodes on both sides, a thin bridgewire soldered across the sides, all dipped in ignition and output mixes) to initiate the primary explosive, rather than direct contact between the bridgewire and the primary explosive.  The match can be manufactured separately from the rest of the cap and only assembled at the end of the process.

Match type caps are now the most common type found worldwide.

Exploding bridgewire detonator or blasting cap

This type of detonator was invented in the 1940s as part of the Manhattan Project to develop nuclear weapons.  The design goal was to produce a detonator which acted very rapidly and predictably.  Both Match and Solid Pack type electric caps take a few milliseconds to fire, as the bridgewire heats up and heats the explosive to the point of detonation.  Explosive bridgewire or EBW detonators use a higher voltage electric charge and a very thin bridgewire, .04 inch long, .0016 diameter, (1 mm long, 0.04 mm diameter).  Instead of heating up the explosive, the EBW detonator wire is heated so quickly by the high firing current that the wire actually vaporizes and explodes due to electric resistance heating.  That electrically driven explosion then fires the detonator's initiator explosive (usually PETN).

Some similar detonators use a thin metal foil instead of a wire, but operate in the same manner as true bridgewire detonators.

In addition to firing very quickly when properly activated, EBW detonators are safe from stray static electricity and other electric current.  Enough current will melt the bridgewire, but it cannot detonate the initiator explosive without the full high-voltage high-current charge passing through the bridgewire.  EBW detonators are used in many civilian applications where radio signals, static electricity, or other electrical hazards might cause accidents with conventional electric detonators.

Slapper detonator or blasting cap

Slapper detonators are an improvement on EBW detonators.  Slappers, instead of directly using the exploding foil to detonate the initiator explosive, use the electrical vaporization of the foil to drive a small circle of insulating material such as PET film or kapton down a circular hole in an additional disc of insulating material.  At the far end of that hole is a pellet of conventional initiator explosive.

The conversion efficiency of energy from electricity into kinetic energy of the flying disk or slapper can be 20–40%.

Since the slapper impacts a wide area—40 thousandths of an inch (roughly one mm) across—of the explosive, rather than a thin line or point as in an exploding foil or bridgewire detonator, the detonation is more regular and requires less energy.  Reliable detonation requires raising a minimum volume of explosive to temperatures and pressures at which detonation starts.  If energy is deposited at a single point, it can radiate away in the explosive in all directions in rarefaction or expansion waves, and only a small volume is efficiently heated or compressed.  The flier disc loses impact energy at its sides to rarefaction waves, but a conical volume of explosive is efficiently shock compressed.

Slapper detonators are used in nuclear weapons. These components require large quantities of energy to initiate, making them extremely unlikely to accidentally discharge.

Laser ordnance initiators
In this type, a pulse from a laser passes down an optical fiber to strike and thus initiate a carbon-doped explosive. These initiators are highly reliable. Unintentional initiation is very difficult as the explosive can only be detonated by the attached laser, which is precisely tuned to do so, or a completely independent laser that matches.

History
The first blasting cap or detonator was demonstrated in 1745 when British physician and apothecary William Watson showed that the electric spark of a friction machine could ignite black powder, by way of igniting a flammable substance mixed in with the black powder.

In 1750, Benjamin Franklin in Philadelphia made a commercial blasting cap consisting of a paper tube full of black powder, with wires leading in both sides and wadding sealing up the ends.  The two wires came close but did not touch, so a large electric spark discharge between the two wires would fire the cap.

In 1832, a hot wire detonator was produced by American chemist Robert Hare, although attempts along similar lines had earlier been attempted by the Italians Volta and Cavallo.  Hare constructed his blasting cap by passing a multistrand wire through a charge of gunpowder inside a tin tube; he had cut all but one fine strand of the multistrand wire so that the fine strand would serve as the hot bridgewire. When a strong current from a large battery (which he called a "deflagrator" or "calorimotor") was passed through the fine strand, it became incandescent and ignited the charge of gunpowder.

In 1863, Alfred Nobel realized that although nitroglycerin could not be detonated by a fuse, it could be detonated by the explosion of a small charge of gunpowder, which in turn was ignited by a fuse. Within a year, he was adding mercury fulminate to the gunpowder charges of his detonators, and by 1867 he was using small copper capsules of mercury fulminate, triggered by a fuse, to detonate nitroglycerin.

In 1868, Henry Julius Smith of Boston introduced a cap that combined a spark gap ignitor and mercury fulminate, the first electric cap able to detonate dynamite.

In 1875, Smith—and then in 1887, Perry G. Gardner of North Adams, Massachusetts—developed electric detonators that combined a hot wire detonator with mercury fulminate explosive. These were the first generally modern type blasting caps. Modern caps use different explosives and separate primary and secondary explosive charges, but are generally very similar to the Gardner and Smith caps.

Smith also invented the first satisfactory portable power supply for igniting blasting caps: a high-voltage magneto that was driven by a rack and pinion, which in turn was driven by a T-handle that was pushed downwards.

Electric match caps were developed in the early 1900s in Germany, and spread to the US in the 1950s when ICI International purchased Atlas Powder Co. These match caps have become the predominant world standard cap type.

See also

 Blasting machine (Dynamite detonator box)
 Dead man's trigger
 Detonation
 Detonating cord
 Detonator (railway)
 Exploding-bridgewire detonator
 Explosive booster
 Explosive material
 Firing pin
 Fuse (explosives)
 NASA standard detonator
 Nuclear weapon design
 Pencil detonator
 Shock tube detonator
 Slapper detonator
 Triggering sequence
 Urchin (detonator)
 Improvised explosive device
 TM 31-210 Improvised Munitions Handbook

References

Further reading
 Cooper, Paul W. Explosives Engineering. New York: Wiley-VCH, 1996.  .

External links 

 1956 safety film "Blasting Cap - Danger!" from Prelinger Archives
 Modelling and Simulation of Burst Phenomenon in Electrically Exploded Foils 

 
Bombs
Explosives
Pyrotechnic initiators